Two submarines of the French Navy have borne the name Souffleur:

 , a  launched in 1903 and stricken in 1914
 , a  launched in 1924 and sunk in 1941

French Navy ship names